William Hastie Geissler (1894 - 1963) was a Scottish artist known for his watercolours of the natural world. He was one of The Edinburgh School, and much of his earlier work came from sketching trips undertaken with other members of this group, though he himself is sometimes described as a "neglected" member. Although his natural preference lay with watercolour, often with gouache and pen and ink, several works in oil survive.

Early life and education
William Geissler was the grandson of Paul Richard Geissler, who in the 1850s had emigrated from Hirschfeld, Saxony in Germany to Edinburgh, where he settled and married, pursuing a career as a music teacher for children of well-to-do families. Following the collapse of the City of Glasgow Bank in 1878, the financial conditions of Paul Richard's clients, as well as his own, became severely strained. As a result, he advised his own children to seek careers that guaranteed security. Thus it was that Hermann Richard Geissler became a railway clerk. Hermann married Jane Hastie on 26 September 1893, and William was born precisely nine months later. William was educated at James Gillespie's Primary School and Boroughmuir High School in Edinburgh, where his precocious interest in drawing was remarked early on. After the drudgery of his father's generation William could begin to develop his inherited artistic talents. On leaving school he was employed as an apprentice draughtsman and engraver with Thomas Nelson, the publishing firm and printer in Edinburgh. At the same time he also attended evening classes at Edinburgh College of Art (ECA). At the outbreak of war he joined the Royal Scots Regiment and was posted to northern France in 1915, serving in the Battle of the Somme. Later in the war, in mid 1917, he was seconded to the Royal Engineers, whose need for skilled map draughtsmen was pressing.

Post First World War Life
After demobilisation from the army in 1919, he attended Edinburgh College of Art as a full-time student. Geissler and William Gillies both graduated from ECA in June 1922. In 1923, Geissler, Gillies and William Crozier, having won scholarships, travelled to Paris to study with André Lhote. On his return from Paris, the formal cubist influence of Lhote in Geissler's work softened and was transformed by his own observation of the geometry of the natural world. He exhibited for several years with colleagues as a member of The 1922 Group, an association of ECA graduates who had been awarded travelling scholarships, and whose annual exhibitions were shown at the New Gallery, Shandwick Place, Edinburgh. Exhibitions included work by Geissler, Gillies, William MacTaggart (the Younger), John Maxwell and Crozier.

Geissler tutored at Edinburgh College of Art in the 1920s before being appointed Art Master at Perth Academy in 1928. In 1931 he married Alison McDonald, later known as the glass engraver Alison Geissler, with whom he had three children, Paul, Erik and Catherine. In 1935 he took a post teaching art at Moray House College of Education, becoming Head of the Art Department in 1947 until his retirement in 1962. He was a member of the Society of Scottish Artists (SSA), of which he was President from 1954 to 1957, and of the Royal Scottish Society of Painters in Watercolour (RSW).

 
He worked from close observation of nature, with scenes of lowland Scottish farms and farmsteads, of harbours with fishing boats, and of woodlands and trees. His landscapes are almost all without figures. His vision encompassed not only broad landscapes but was also enthralled by their finer details, as in Roots, Undergrowth, Toadstools, Dead Wood,  Hemlock. As if plants and trees were the representation of life, some of his works at the end of the Second World War create a haunting, sinister mood, the expression of his desolation at the scene of a forest near Carrbridge felled by a storm. After 1951, however, vacations in the New Forest in Hampshire infused his paintings with bright colour and sun.

An MPhil thesis devoted to his work was completed by Norman Shaw in 1994, from which much of the information in this entry is drawn.

In the 1950s he developed an interest in cinematography as a means of teaching art in schools. With the participation of teachers and school children from Norton Park School he took an active part in the production of two films set in Edinburgh, The Singing Street and Happy Weekend.

A retrospective exhibition of his paintings entitled Poetry of Place was held at Edinburgh College of Art in 1996.

Several of his works have not been traced. References to some notable paintings not shown here are listed below, followed by a selection of some of his known works, arranged in approximate chronological order to show the development of his style and choice of subject matter during his career (see also ):

Moniaive, Watercolour, SSA exhibition 1934
Highland Fling (SSA exhibition 1938)
Toadstools, Watercolour with pen and ink (SSA exhibition 1943)
The Monk's Walk (RSA exhibition 1944)
Tree Stumps, Gouache, 1946 
Gateway, Watercolour on paper, 1947, RSW exhibition 1950
Roots, Watercolour, gouache, pen and ink on paper, late 1940s
Woodcuts, illustrations of books on plants

References

Alumni of the Edinburgh College of Art
1894 births
1963 deaths
Scottish watercolourists
Artists from Edinburgh
Landscape artists
20th-century Scottish painters
Scottish people of German descent
People educated at Boroughmuir High School